Kalankini Kankabati is a 1981 Indian Bengali-language crime drama film directed by Uttam Kumar and Pijush Basu, based on a novel of Nihar Ranjan Gupta. It starring Uttam Kumar, Supriya Choudhury, Sharmila Tagore, Mithun Chakraborty in pivotal roles.

Plot
Zamindar Raj Shekhar Rai lives with his wife Sureshwari, a son and a daughter. Despite being married, he brings Aparna Bai and falls in love with her. This tradition is from generation to generation in the house. To save her son from this tradition, Sureshwari sends him to Kolkata city for studying. Meanwhile, Raj Shekhar Rai tries to convince Aparna Bai giving different facilities, but she is in love with another man, who is the henchman of Raj Shekhar. When Raj Shekhar hears about it, he orders to get out from his area, but the henchman desperately comes to meet Aparna Bai to take her with him. By the other henchmen, Raj Shekhar knows about it, as a result, the henchman was killed by Raj Shekhar, but Aparna Bai survives and gives birth a daughter Kankabati. Years later, Raj Shekhar learns of it and kidnaps Kankabati to take revenge on Aparna Bai.

Years pass, Raj Shekhar's son Shashanka Shekhar, returns to his house. Now he sees Kankabati and falls in love with her, but he doesn't know that his mother Sureshwari, has already fixed his marriage with daughter of Zamindar from Nishchindapur.

Cast
Uttam Kumar as Raj Shekhar Rai
Supriya Choudhury as Sureshwari Rai
Sharmila Tagore as Aparna Bai / Kankabati
Mithun Chakraborty as Shashanka Shekhar Rai

Soundtrack

References

External links
 

1981 films
Bengali-language Indian films
Films scored by R. D. Burman
1980s Bengali-language films